Kungssången (The King's Song) is the Swedish royal anthem. It is also known by its first line, Ur svenska hjärtans djup en gång. Although sung on such occasions as the King's birthday, the annual opening of the Riksdag and the Nobel Prize ceremony, the song is not considered the Swedish national anthem. Du gamla, Du fria is the de facto national anthem of Sweden, but has never been officially recognised.

The lyrics were written by Carl Vilhelm August Strandberg and the music composed for four part male chorus by Otto Lindblad. Kungssången replaced the previous royal anthem, Bevare Gud vår kung, which was sung to the melody of the British royal anthem, God Save the King. It was first performed in Lund on 5 December 1844 at a party arranged by the University to celebrate the accession of King Oscar I, and was officially adopted in 1893.

Lyrics 
Only the first and fifth stanzas are normally sung (and only the first if the King is present). The other three are very rarely ever heard.

See also
 Gustafs skål

References

External links
Sound file (mp3)
Sound file (midi)
Lyrics

Royal anthems
National symbols of Sweden
Swedish monarchy
European anthems